Držilovo is a village in the municipality of Sopište, North Macedonia.

History 
During the great migration movements in Macedonia at the end of the 17th and beginning of the 18th centuries, Macedonian Muslims left the Debar area for the central regions of Macedonia and established villages such as Držilovo located in the Skopje area.

Demographics
Držilovo has traditionally been inhabited by a Macedonian Muslim (Torbeš) population. In Držilovo, the language of the household and of daily communication is Macedonian.

According to the 2002 census, the village had a total of 362 inhabitants. Ethnic groups in the village include:

Turks 242
Macedonians 115
Others 5

References

Villages in Sopište Municipality
Turkish communities in North Macedonia
Macedonian Muslim villages